In celestial mechanics, the argument of latitude is an angular parameter that defines the position of a body moving along a Kepler orbit. It is the angle between the ascending node and the body.

It is the sum of the more commonly used true anomaly and argument of periapsis. 

 

where  is the argument of latitude,  the true anomaly, and  the argument of periapsis.

References
Wakker, K. F. (2007). "Astrodynamics", Delft University of Technology.

Orbits